"Superhero (Heroes & Villains)" is a song by American record producer Metro Boomin, American rapper Future, and American singer Chris Brown, from the former's second studio album Heroes & Villains (2022). It was produced alongside Allen Ritter and David X Eli. The song peaked at number 8 on the Billboard Hot 100.

Composition
"Superhero (Heroes & Villains)" is a trap song that features "pummeling 808s and muted horns" in the production, over which Future raps in his "customary, chant-like flow", and style similar to "the days of DS2" In the latter portion, the instrumental "fades into somber synths", for "distorted melodies" from Chris Brown, who sings about people who do not want to see him succeed. The song also contains a sample of rapper Jay-Z's line about living "long enough to see yourself become a villain" in "So Appalled" by Kanye West (which is a reference to Harvey Dent's quote in the film The Dark Knight).

Critical reception
The song received generally positive reviews from critics. Hamza Riaz of Mic Cheque deemed it as one of the "bone-chilling cuts" and best tracks from Heroes & Villains, although also writing that "When there is a new voice, they are shoehorned onto a disconnected strand of a track that would've benefited without it", bringing up the song as an example. Peter A. Berry of Complex praised Future's vocals, describing them as "mix of menace, rambunctiousness and comically straightforward obscenity", as well as the transition in production, describing it "as theatrical as it is smooth." Brady Brickner-Wood of Pitchfork wrote, "Even Future's got a little pep in his step here, particularly on the anthemic 'Superheroes (Heroes & Villains)', although he criticised Chris Brown's apperance."

Music video
A music video for the song was released on December 2, 2022 alongside Heroes & Villains. It begins with Metro Boomin and Future involved in a tense diamond theft, before shifting to a series of surreal scenes, including Metro surfing in the sky. Chris Brown and his respective verse at the end of the song do not appear in the video.

Charts

Certifications

References

2022 songs
Metro Boomin songs
Future (rapper) songs
Chris Brown songs
Songs written by Metro Boomin
Songs written by Future (rapper)
Songs written by Chris Brown
Songs written by Kanye West
Songs written by Jay-Z
Songs written by Pusha T
Songs written by Cyhi the Prynce
Songs written by Swizz Beatz
Songs written by Mike Dean (record producer)
Songs written by RZA
Songs written by No I.D.
Songs written by Allen Ritter
Song recordings produced by Metro Boomin
Song recordings produced by Allen Ritter